Obages is a genus of longhorn beetles of the subfamily Lamiinae, containing the following species:

 Obages cameroni Breuning, 1972
 Obages flavosticticus Breuning, 1939
 Obages palparis Pascoe, 1866
 Obages tuberculipennis Breuning, 1961
 Obages tuberculosus Breuning, 1973

References

Morimopsini